Events in the year 1983 in Belgium.

Incumbents
 Monarch: Baudouin
 Prime Minister: Wilfried Martens

Events

Publications
 Hugo Claus, Het verdriet van België
 Francis Delpérée, Chroniques de crise, 1977-1982 (Brussels, C.R.I.S.P.)
 Ernest Vandevyvere, De watervoorziening te Brugge van de 13e tot de 20e eeuw (Bruges)
 I. Verbeeck, Functionele analyse van de sleepdiensten in de haven van Antwerpen (Antwerp)

Art and architecture
Cinematic releases
 Brussels by Night, directed by Marc Didden

Births
 25 January – Astrid Coppens, performer
 31 January – Tom Vangeneugden, Olympic swimmer
 26 February – Andrei Lugovski, Belarusian-born tenor
 12 March – Sigrid Persoon, gymnast
 11 May – Frédéric Xhonneux, athlete
 2 June – Jo Deman, scouting executive
 16 September - Katerine Avgoustakis, singer
 6 October – Nina van Koeckhoven, athlete
 25 October – Nawell Madani, media figure

Deaths
 15 March – Albert-Émile de Beauffort (born 1899), colonial administrator
 11 July – Paul Harsin (born 1902), historian
 25 September – Leopold III (born 1901)

References

 
1980s in Belgium
20th century in Belgium
Events in Belgium
Deaths in Belgium